KARMA is a 2008 Indonesian movie based on true events. The film was directed by Allan Lunardi, written by Salman Aristo, and stars Joe Taslim, Dominique Diyose, Jonathan Mulia, HIM Damsyik, and Jenny Chang. This film was released on July 24, 2008. The plot follows Sandra, a young woman who marries into a family haunted by ghosts.

Plot
No females remain in Guan's (Him Damsyik) family. Philip (Hengky Solaiman) is the only child of Guan. From Philip's two marriages, he has children named Martin (Verdi Solaiman) and Arman (Joe Taslim). Arman decides to leave the house to study in Australia. In Australia, Arman meets Sandra (Dominique Diyose) and they fall in love. Sandra gets pregnant (out of wedlock) and is kicked out of home. Armand returns home and takes Sandra with him to his own family. Their arrival is greeted with a thrown glass. Strange sounds follow in the middle of the night and a female figure appears dressed in ancient Chinese dress, along with voices telling her to get out of the house, constantly terrorize her. From the people who had contact with Guan's family, Sandra discovers that every woman who enters the Guan's family will get hurt. However, because of her love for Armand and their unborn child, Sandra insists on staying and looking for ways to stop the karma that exists in Guan family.

The arrival of Armand and Sandra is not greeted with happiness by Armand's grandfather, Guan.

External links
 @KARMA – Starvision
 Karma at FilmAffinity

Indonesian thriller drama films